Oneida is a city in Nemaha County, Kansas, United States.  As of the 2020 census, the population of the city was 61.

History
Oneida was laid out about 1873. It was named after the Oneida people. The town's streets were named after the main thoroughfares of Chicago.

Geography
Oneida is located at  (39.865877, -95.938733).

Demographics

2010 census
As of the census of 2010, there were 75 people, 26 households, and 17 families living in the city. The racial makeup of the city was 98.7% White and 1.3% African American.

There were 26 households, of which 38.5% had children under the age of 18 living with them, 65.4% were married couples living together, and 34.6% were non-families. 23.1% of all households were made up of individuals, and 3.8% had someone living alone who was 65 years of age or older. The average household size was 2.88 and the average family size was 3.59.

The median age in the city was 34.5 years. 36% of residents were under the age of 18; 4% were between the ages of 18 and 24; 28% were from 25 to 44; 20.1% were from 45 to 64; and 12% were 65 years of age or older. The gender makeup of the city was 46.7% male and 53.3% female.

2000 census
As of the census of 2000, there were 70 people, 25 households, and 18 families living in the city. The racial makeup of the city was 97.14% White and 2.86% African American.

There were 25 households, out of which 40.0% had children under the age of 18 living with them, 60.0% were married couples living together, 8.0% had a female householder with no husband present, and 28.0% were non-families. 28.0% of all households were made up of individuals, and 20.0% had someone living alone who was 65 years of age or older. The average household size was 2.80 and the average family size was 3.50.

In the city, the population was spread out, with 30.0% under the age of 18, 8.6% from 18 to 24, 28.6% from 25 to 44, 18.6% from 45 to 64, and 14.3% who were 65 years of age or older. The median age was 33 years. For every 100 females, there were 133.3 males. For every 100 females age 18 and over, there were 122.7 males.

The median income for a household in the city was $45,417, and the median income for a family was $48,750. Males had a median income of $33,125 versus $23,750 for females. The per capita income for the city was $16,138. There were no families and 6.7% of the population living below the poverty line, including no under eighteens and none of those over 64.

Education
The community is served by Nemaha Central USD 115 public school district.

References

External links
 Oneida - Directory of Public Officials
 Oneida city map, KDOT

Cities in Nemaha County, Kansas
Cities in Kansas
1873 establishments in Kansas
Populated places established in 1873